Chester Melvin Vaniman (October 30, 1866 – July 2, 1912) was an American aviator and photographer who specialized in panoramic images. He shot images from gas balloons, ships masts, tall buildings and even a home-made  pole. He scaled buildings, hung from self-made slings, and scaled dangerous heights to capture his unique images.

Early life 
Born to a farming family in Virden, Illinois, Vaniman was the eldest of four sons and attended Valparaiso University in Indiana and Chicago.

Career

Photography 
Vaniman's photographic career began in Hawaii in 1901, and ended some time in 1904. He spent over a year photographing Australia and New Zealand on behalf of the Oceanic Steamship Company, creating promotional images for the company, many as panoramas and which popularised the format in Australia, which was taken up with enthusiasm by Robert Vere Scott among others. During this time the New Zealand Government also commissioned panoramas.

Beginning in 1903, he spent over a year photographing Sydney and the surrounding areas. It was during this time that he created his best known work, the panorama of Sydney, shot from a hot air balloon he had specially imported from the United States. Vaniman is best known for his images of Hawaii, Australia, and New Zealand.

Aerial exploration 

Some time around 1904, he gave up photography and took up exploration. This included attempts at the North Pole and the Trans-Atlantic crossing, both of which were attempted in Walter Wellman's airship .

At the first attempt to cross the Atlantic in 1910, Vaniman sent one of the first aerial radio transmissions when he urged the launch boat to "come and get this goddamn cat!" The cat, named Kiddo, had caused such a ruckus that it finally had to be placed inside a gunny sack and suspended below the airship's gondola.

Death 
Vaniman lost his life during his second attempt at a trans-Atlantic airship crossing when his airship, the Goodyear built  Akron, (not the later US Navy airship of the same name) exploded off the New Jersey shore on July 2, 1912. Filled with 11,300 cubic meters of hydrogen gas, his was the first American airship that could compare to the better known European manufactured models.

Vaniman and his crew of four were killed just a few minutes after the Akron became airborne, when it suddenly exploded in front of the gathered crowd near Atlantic City, and the burning gondola plunged  into an inlet. The other victims were his brother, Calvin Vaniman, Fred Elmer, George Bourtillion, and Walter Guest. Subsequent investigation indicated that internal pressure had ruptured the envelope.

References

External links 
 
Wikimedia Commons Category: Melvin Vaniman (includes Photographs by Melvin Vaniman)

19th-century American photographers
20th-century American photographers
1866 births
1912 deaths
Accidental deaths in New Jersey
Aviators from Illinois
Aviators killed in aviation accidents or incidents in the United States
Goodyear Tire and Rubber Company people
People from Virden, Illinois
Photographers from Illinois
Valparaiso University alumni
Victims of aviation accidents or incidents in 1912